Death: An Essay on Finitude is a book by Françoise Dastur in which the author explores philosophical aspects of death in the continental perspective.

Reception
The book was reviewed by Mark Sinclair and Stan Van Hooft.

References

External links 
Death: An Essay on Finitude
LA MORT. Essai sur la finitude

1996 non-fiction books
English-language books
Works about philosophy of death
French-language books
1994 non-fiction books